Kostbera is the wife of the mythical Norse hero Hogni. She is mentioned in Atlamál. With Hogni they are the parents of four sons: Solar, Snævar, Hniflung and Gjuki. Gjuki is only mentioned in Drap Niflunga.

German heroic legends
Legendary Norsemen
Women in mythology